Michal Ordoš (born 27 January 1983) is a Czech professional footballer who plays as a forward for FK Blansko.

Club career
Ordoš is a prolific goalscorer. In the 2008–09 season, he scored nine goals. In the 2009-2010 season Ordoš scored 12 goals, becoming the Gambrinus liga top-scorer.

In July 2017, Ordoš signed with Austrian club SC Retz. He left the club at the end of the year to join another Austrian club SC Wieselburg.

Ordoš joined 1. SC Znojmo for the 2017–18 season in the summer 2018. He played there until February 2019, where he joined FK Blansko.

International career
He made his debut for Czech national team on 14 November 2012 in a friendly match against Slovakia at the age of 29.

Honours 
SK Sigma Olomouc
 Czech Cup: 2011–12
 Czech Supercup: 2012

References

External links
 Profile at iDNES.cz
 

Living people
1983 births
People from Znojmo
Association football forwards
Czech footballers
Czech First League players
Austrian Football Bundesliga players
Cypriot First Division players
1. FC Slovácko players
FK Mladá Boleslav players
Bohemians 1905 players
SK Sigma Olomouc players
Kapfenberger SV players
Karmiotissa FC players
1. SC Znojmo players
Czech Republic international footballers
Czech expatriate footballers
Expatriate footballers in Austria
Expatriate footballers in Cyprus
Sportspeople from the South Moravian Region